
The following lists events that happened during 1838 in South Africa.

Events

February
 4 February - The Zulu King, Dingaan signs a deed of cession to cede land to the voortrekkers led by Piet Retief

April
 9 April - Battle of Italeni where Zulus repulsed the Voortrekkers.
 11 April - Voortrekker leaders Piet Uys and his son Dirkie Uys die in battle at the hands of the Zulus.

December
 4 December - British forces occupy Durban.
 16 December - The Battle of Blood River, Voortrekkers under Andries Pretorius defeat the Zulus.
 22 December - Potchefstroom is established

Unknown
 A municipality is formed covering the Green Point-Sea Point areas in Cape Town
 The Voortrekkers establish Natalia Republic with Pietermaritzburg as capital

Deaths
 6 February - Voortrekker leader Piet Retief and his men are murdered by the Zulus under the command of Dingaan
 25 October - Voortrekker leader Louis Tregardt (55), died of malaria in Delagoa bay

References
See Years in South Africa for list of References

 
South Africa
Years in South Africa